Blue Flame is an American 1993 independent sci-fi film starring former child actress Kerri Green as one of two seductive aliens who live inside the head of a renegade police officer.

External links

1993 films
American independent films
1993 science fiction films
Films scored by Tyler Bates
1990s American films